Grand County is the name of two counties in the United States:

Grand County, Colorado
Grand County, Utah